The 1993 IIHF European U18 Championship was the twenty-sixth playing of the IIHF European Junior Championships.

Group A
Played April 2 to 9, 1993 in Nowy Targ and Oswiecim, Poland.

First round
Group 1

Group 2

Final round
Championship round

7th place

Italy was relegated to Group B for 1994.

Tournament Awards
Top Scorer  Tomás Blazek (13 points)
Top Goalie: Denis Kuzmenko
Top Defenceman:Radim Bicanek
Top Forward: Niklas Sundström

Group B 
Played March 18 to 28, 1993 in Bucharest, Romania.

Switzerland was promoted to Group A and Great Britain was relegated to Group C, for 1994.

Group C

Qualification 
Played November 4 and 5, 1992.

Played March 22 to 28, in Riga Latvia.  Seven of the nine participants were new to the tournament.

First round 
Group 1

Group 2

Group 3

Final round 
1st-3rd place

4th-6th place

7th-9th place

Belarus was promoted to Group B for 1994.

References

Complete results

Junior
IIHF European Junior Championship tournament
IIHF European U18 Championship
Sport in Oświęcim
Junior
International ice hockey competitions hosted by Poland
IIHF European U18 Championship
International ice hockey competitions hosted by Romania
Junior
1990s in Bucharest
Sports competitions in Bucharest
Sports competitions in Riga
1990s in Riga
Junior
International ice hockey competitions hosted by Latvia
Ice hockey in Riga